Will Ludwigsen is an American writer of horror, mystery, and science fiction. His work has appeared in a number of magazines including Alfred Hitchcock's Mystery Magazine, Cemetery Dance, Weird Tales, and Strange Horizons. He has also published three collections, including the highly praised In Search Of and Others.

Writing career
Ludwigsen earned his bachelor's degree in English from the University of Florida in 1994, followed by a Masters in the same discipline at the University of North Florida in 2005, and later, an MFA from University of Southern Maine. He is also a 2006 graduate of the Clarion East Writers Workshop. He is currently adjunct faculty at University of North Florida, where he teaches Creative Writing among other courses.

Ludwigesen's 2013 short story collection, In Search of and Others, was nominated for a Shirley Jackson Award for best single author collection. The book was well received, with starred reviews from both Kirkus Reviews and Publishers Weekly, which called it a "hauntingly beautiful collection." The title comes from the documentary television series In Search Of..., which was devoted to "mysterious phenomena" and hosted by Leonard Nimoy.

Bibliography

Collections
 Cthulhu Fhtagn, Baby! and Other Cosmic Insolence (Lethe Press, 2006)
 In Search of and Others (Lethe Press, 2013)

Short fiction
 "Cthulhu Fhtagn, Baby!": Spring 2002, Weird Tales
 "Nessmass": Spring 2002, Whispers From the Shattered Forum #11
 "Representative Sample": Summer 2002, Artemis Magazine
 "The Trespasser": 2002, Cemetery Dance #40
 "And Justice for Doll": September 2003, Alfred Hitchcock's Mystery Magazine
 "Bingo": May 2004, Alfred Hitchcock's Mystery Magazine
 "Rubbernecker's Lament": October 2004, Chiaroscuro
 "Soured": 2005, Horrorfind (Honorable Mention, Year's Best Fantasy and Horror #18, 2005)
 "Solidity": 2006, Travel Guide to the Haunted Mid-Atlantic (Honorable Mention, Year's Best Fantasy and Horror #20, 2007)
 "Faraji": April/May 2007, Weird Tales
 "My Old Man's Seance": June/July 2007, Weird Tales
 "All Talk": March 2008, Strange Horizons
 "In Search Of": June 2008, Alfred Hitchcock's Mystery Magazine
 "A Good Psycho is Hard to Find": 2008, Blood Lite
 "Remembrance is Something Like a House": 2009, Interfictions 2
 "The Speed of Dreams": March 2010, Asimov's Science Fiction
 "The Ghost Factory", Asimov's Science Fiction, 36/10&11 (Oct/Nov 2012)

References

External links
 Will Ludwigsen website
 HorrorWorld column archives
 

1973 births
American short story writers
American horror writers
Living people
Writers from Wilmington, Delaware
University of Florida alumni
University of North Florida alumni